Bom Jesus do Tocantins is a municipality located in the Brazilian state of Tocantins. Its population is estimated at 5,008 (2020), and its area is 1333 km².

The Kỳikatêjê and Parkatêjê languages are spoken by the Kỳikatêjê and Parkatêjê peoples respectively in Terra Indígena Mãe Maria, which is located within the municipality of Bom Jesus do Tocantins.

Sports
In 2009, Gavião Kyikatejê Futebol Clube was founded in Bom Jesus do Tocantins, becoming the first professional indigenous football club in Brazil.

References

Municipalities in Tocantins